Huetar may be,

Huetar language
a historical region of Costa Rica named after the Huetars